W. H. Applewhite House is a historic plantation house located near Stantonsburg, Wilson County, North Carolina.  It was built about 1847, and is a two-story, three bay, single pile, Greek Revival style frame dwelling.  It has a one-story, shed roofed rear wing. It features a double-gallery porch with sawn ornament and trim added about 1900.  The house was remodeled about 1870–1880.  Also on the property are the contributing tenant house, packhouse, stables, sheds, and tobacco barns.

It was listed on the National Register of Historic Places in 1986.

References

Plantation houses in North Carolina
Houses on the National Register of Historic Places in North Carolina
Greek Revival houses in North Carolina
Houses completed in 1847
Houses in Wilson County, North Carolina
National Register of Historic Places in Wilson County, North Carolina
1847 establishments in North Carolina